The Brazil national rugby sevens team competes at international level. Rugby sevens has grown in Brazil among rugby players. The country has competitive male and female squads. The sport in governed in Brazil by the Brazilian Rugby Confederation.

The Brazilian men's team finished 6th at the 2015 Pan American Games. The team hosted the 2016 Olympic tournament in Rio de Janeiro.

Tournament history

Summer Olympic Games

Pan American Games

South American Games

World Games

World Rugby Sevens Series

The 2012 USA Sevens tournament was the first time Brazil had competed in a World Series event since 2002.  Brazil had a disappointing tournament, finishing 0-5. Brazil hoped to use the 2012 USA Sevens as a platform to continue to develop and grow sevens. Brazil fielded the least experienced team in the tournament, with Daniel Hubert Gregg the only Brazilian player with prior World Series experience.

As of the 2016-17 season, Brazil has lost all games in the World Series tournaments.

Results by season

Team

Previous squads

See also
 Rugby union in Brazil
 Brazil national rugby union team
 Brazilian Rugby Confederation

References

External links
Official website
WorldRugby profile

National rugby sevens teams
Brazil national rugby union team
Rugby sevens
Rugby sevens in Brazil